Port of Bilhorod-Dnistrovsky is a port in the city of Bilhorod-Dnistrovsky, Ukraine. It is located on the north-western shore of Black Sea at Dniester Estuary, to the south-west from Odessa.

Bilhorod-Dnistrovsky Seaport is mainly a freight seaport. The port covers some 64.5 thousands hectares. Port also has a special port "Buhaz" with a single pier. Upon the entrance to the Dniester estuary a local bridge allows  of clearance for the incoming ships.

Port "Buhaz" is located in somewhat remote location from the main port in the town of Zatoka which is part of Bilhorod-Dnistrovsky city municipality.

References

External links
 Ukrmorrichflot State Administration website
 Belgorod-Dnestrovskiy website

Buildings and structures in Odesa Oblast
Bilhorod-Dnistrovskyi
Ports of Odesa Oblast
Ukrainian Sea Ports Authority